Palo Pinto is an unincorporated community in Benton County, Missouri, United States.

History
Palo Pinto was founded in 1876. A post office called Palo Pinto was established in 1877, and remained in operation until 1904. The name may be a transfer from Palo Pinto County, Texas.

References

Unincorporated communities in Benton County, Missouri
Unincorporated communities in Missouri